Pleckgate High School is a mixed, Ofsted rated Outstanding secondary school located in Blackburn, Lancashire, England.

Previously a community school and Mathematics and Computing College administered by Blackburn with Darwen Borough Council, in February 2016 Pleckgate High School converted to academy status. The school is now sponsored by The Education Partnership Trust, but continues to coordinate with Blackburn with Darwen Borough Council for admissions.

The current Headteacher of the Academy is Aishling McGinty, who took up post in September 2022.

Upon being inspected by Ofsted, in January 2019, the school received a judgement of 'Outstanding' in all categories.

References

External links
 

Secondary schools in Blackburn with Darwen
Schools in Blackburn
Academies in Blackburn with Darwen